Tanacetopsis is a genus of flowering plants belonging to the family Asteraceae.

Its native range is Afghanistan to Central Asia and Western Himalaya. .

Species:

Tanacetopsis afghanica 
Tanacetopsis botschantzevii 
Tanacetopsis doabensis 
Tanacetopsis eriobasis 
Tanacetopsis ferganensis 
Tanacetopsis freitagii 
Tanacetopsis goloskokovii 
Tanacetopsis handeliiformis 
Tanacetopsis hedgei 
Tanacetopsis kamelinii 
Tanacetopsis karataviensis 
Tanacetopsis korovinii 
Tanacetopsis krascheninnikovii 
Tanacetopsis mucronata 
Tanacetopsis pamiralaica 
Tanacetopsis pjataevae 
Tanacetopsis popovii 
Tanacetopsis santoana 
Tanacetopsis setacea 
Tanacetopsis submarginata 
Tanacetopsis subsimilis 
Tanacetopsis tripinnatifida 
Tanacetopsis urgutensis

References

Anthemideae
Asteraceae genera